Emittance may refer to: 
Beam emittance, the area occupied by a beam in a position-and-momentum phase space
Radiant emittance, the radiant flux emitted by a surface per unit area
Thermal emittance, emissivity of a surface